Aiono Nonumalo Sofara is a chief (matai) and former Member of Parliament in Samoa. He was a member of the Human Rights Protection Party (HRPP) and later the Samoan National Development Party (SNDP).

He became Speaker of the National Legislature when the Human Rights Protection Party first came to power. He was the Speaker from 1982 to 1987. Nonumalo then went on to join the SNDP. He was also a strong opponent of the introduction of universal suffrage, and actively sought to have the act repealed.

Aiono was married to the late Eni Sofara, sister of two other Samoan parliamentarians, Laulu Fetauimalemau Mata'afa and Matatumua Maimoana.

References

Samoan chiefs
Living people
Year of birth missing (living people)
Speakers of the Legislative Assembly of Samoa
Members of the Legislative Assembly of Samoa
Human Rights Protection Party politicians
Samoan National Development Party politicians
Mataʻafa family